Vice Admiral Sir John Francis Coward,  (11 October 1937 – 30 May 2020) was a Royal Navy officer who served as Commandant of the Royal College of Defence Studies from 1992 to 1994.

Naval career
Coward joined the Royal Navy in 1958. He was appointed Flag Officer Sea Training in 1987, Flag Officer, First Flotilla in 1988, and Flag Officer Submarines and Commander of the Eastern Atlantic Submarine Area in 1989. He became Commandant of the Royal College of Defence Studies in 1992 and retired in 1994.

In retirement Coward became Lieutenant Governor of Guernsey.

He died on 30 May 2020 at the age of 82.

References

|-

|-

|-

1937 births
2020 deaths
Royal Navy vice admirals
Royal Navy personnel of the Falklands War
Knights Commander of the Order of the Bath
Companions of the Distinguished Service Order